Kusu Moses Makasi (born 22 September 1995) is an English professional footballer who plays as a midfielder.

Career
Makasi signed his first professional contract with West Ham United in 2014. He spent time on loan at Chelmsford City in August and September 2015, making six league appearances. He signed a new contract with West Ham in May 2016.

Makasi began the 2017–18 season as captain of the U23 squad and scored in the EFL Trophy win over Swindon Town in August 2017. He was named on the bench for five first-team matches.

In January 2018 he joined Plymouth Argyle on loan for the remainder of the season. He made his first team debut on 13 February 2018, in a 4–2 home win against AFC Wimbledon, coming on as a substitute for Antoni Sarcevic. He scored his first goal for the club in his next game, his first start, in a 1–1 draw away at Fleetwood Town.

In total Makasi played seven league games for Argyle, scoring once. He returned to West Ham in April for cartilage surgery after a knee injury cut short his loan spell. In June 2018 he signed a new one-year contract with West Ham.

Makasi joined League Two club Stevenage on loan on 11 January 2019, signing for the remainder of the 2018–19 season.

Makasi was released by West Ham at the end of the 2018–19 season.

On 30 August 2019, Makasi joined Dutch club FC Eindhoven on a free transfer.

On 5 August 2020 he signed for Swedish club Brage.

Personal life
Makasi was born in England and is of Nigerian descent.

Career statistics

References

1995 births
Living people
English footballers
Footballers from Lewisham
English people of Nigerian descent
West Ham United F.C. players
Chelmsford City F.C. players
Plymouth Argyle F.C. players
Stevenage F.C. players
FC Eindhoven players
IK Brage players
National League (English football) players
English Football League players
Eerste Divisie players
Association football midfielders
Black British sportspeople
English expatriate footballers
English expatriates in the Netherlands
Expatriate footballers in the Netherlands
English expatriate sportspeople in Sweden
Expatriate footballers in Sweden
Superettan players